The 2015–16 Mid-American Conference women's basketball season began with practices in October 2015, followed by the start of the 2015–16 NCAA Division I women's basketball season in November. Conference play began in January 2016 and concluded in March 2016. Ohio won its second straight regular season title with a record of 16–2 by two games over Central Michigan. Nathalie Fontaine of Ball State was named MAC player of the year.

Top-seeded Ohio entered the MAC tournament as the defending champion. Both of its conference losses had come against eight-seeded Buffalo. The young Bulls defeated #9 seed Bowling Green and then upset Ohio for a third time that season in the quarter final.  Buffalo then defeated fifth-seeded Akron and regular season runner-up Central Michigan to win the tournament championship.  Buffalo lost to Ohio State in the NCAA tournament.  Ohio, Central Michigan, Ball State, and Akron all qualified for the WNIT.

Preseason awards
The preseason coaches' poll and league awards were announced by the league office on October 27, 2015.

Preseason women's basketball coaches poll
(First place votes in parenthesis)

East Division
 Ohio (12)
 Akron
 Bowling Green
 Miami
 Buffalo
 Kent State

West Division
 Eastern Michigan (4)
 Ball State (8)
 Western Michigan
 Toledo
 Central Michigan
 Northern Illinois

Regular Season Champion
Ohio (10), Ball State (1), Eastern Michigan (1)

Tournament champs
Ohio (5), Ball State (3), Eastern Michigan (3), Buffalo (1)

Honors

Postseason

Mid–American tournament

NCAA tournament

Women's National Invitational Tournament

Postseason awards

Coach of the Year: Sue Guevara, Central Michigan
Player of the Year: Nathalie Fontaine, Ball State
Freshman of the Year: Presley Hudson, Central Michigan
Defensive Player of the Year: Quiera Lampkins, Ohio
Sixth Man of the Year: Jewel Cotton, Central Michigan and Kaayla McIntyre, Toledo

Honors

See also
2015–16 Mid-American Conference men's basketball season

References